Pradipta is the surname or given name of the following people

Surname
Rizki Amelia Pradipta (born in 1990), Indonesian badminton player

First name
Pradipta Banerji, Indian professor and director
Pradipta Kumar Naik (born in 1966), Indian politician
Pradipta Pramanik (born in 1998), Indian cricket player

Surnames